Fran Rubel Kuzui is an American film director and producer. She received her master's degree from New York University and was a script supervisor for a decade, prior to her first film, 1988's Tokyo Pop, which she co-wrote and directed. The movie was shown at the 1988 Cannes Film Festival and received critical acclaim for its depiction of an American woman trying to make sense of the Japanese youth culture.

She is best known as the director of the 1992 film Buffy the Vampire Slayer, whose original screenplay was the basis for the Buffy the Vampire Slayer television series. She discovered the screenplay of writer Joss Whedon, expanded the Buffy character with him, and together with producer Kaz Kuzui put together the financing to produce the picture. Kuzui served as an executive producer on the TV series and its spin-off Angel, having packaged Buffy along with Kaz Kuzui, Sandollar TV's Gail Berman and Sandy Gallin.  

Along with husband Kaz Kuzui, she founded Kuzui Enterprises, a leader in independent film distribution in Japan that distributes U.S. films there and imports Japanese films for the U.S. market. In 2003, the Kuzuis were among the executive producers for the Thai-Japanese film Last Life in the Universe. In 1997, Kuzui began working with Trey Parker and Matt Stone and produced their film Orgazmo. The Kuzuis also localized and distributed the duo's TV series South Park in Japan. Kuzui Enterprises was among the financiers for Orgazmo and Telling Lies in America.

The Kuzuis worked with artist Keith Haring to establish Pop Shop Tokyo, an art project recognized by museums around the world.

In 2018, it was reported that the Kuzuis are involved with the development of a reboot of Buffy.

Kuzui is a contributing writer at the Nikkei Asian Review and Tokyo bureau chief for Culinary Backstreets.

References

External links

Year of birth missing (living people)
Living people
New York University alumni